Étienne Casimir Hippolyte Cordellier-Delanoue (19 September 1806, Grenoble – 14 November 1854, Paris) was a 19th-century French dramatist, novelist and poet.

Works 
Theatre
1831: Kernox le fou, drama in four acts and in verse, Théâtre de l'Odéon, 17 May
1832; Le Barbier de Louis XI, 1439-1483 Read online
1834: Marguerite de Montmorency in Le Livre de beauté : souvenirs historiques, preface by Charles Nodier
1835: Cromwell et Charles Ier, drama in 5 acts, preceded by Un dernier jour de popularité, prologue in 1 act, Théâtre de la Porte-Saint-Martin, 21 May
1839: Isabelle de Montréal, drama in 2 acts, mingled with singing, with Paul Foucher, Paris, Théâtre de la Gaîté, 10 June
1841: Mathieu Luc, drama in 5 acts in verse, Paris, Théâtre de l'Odéon, 28 October
1847: Le Manchon, comedy in 2 acts in verse, Paris, Théâtre de l'Odéon, 23 March
1847: Qui dort dîne, one-act comédie en vaudevilles, with Eugène Roche, Paris, Théâtre des Variétés, 8 July
1855: Une Épreuve avant la lettre, comédie en vaudevilles in 1 act, with Jules Barbier, Paris, Théâtre des Variétés, 14 February Read online
Varia
1824: La Poésie et la Musique, ou Racine et Mozart, épître à M. Victor S..., play in verse
1826: Épître à sir Walter Scott, play in verse
1845: Les Javanais, histoire de 1682, novel. Aldo published under the title La Couronne d'or in 1851 and reprinted several times under the title  Histoire de 1682 : l'Île de Java between 1875 and 1882.
1847: Jacques Cœur, novel Read online
1851: René d'Anjou, novel
1855: Les Sillons, poésies anciennes et nouvelles

References 

19th-century French dramatists and playwrights
19th-century French novelists
19th-century French poets
Writers from Grenoble
1806 births
1854 deaths